Luo Yijun (born 29 March 1967) is a Taiwanese writer.

Biography 
Luo attended Chinese Culture University, where he studied Chinese literature under authors such as Zhang Dachun, who influenced his early style; he later earned a master's degree in theater from Taipei National University of the Arts. His works include fiction, poetry, essays, and literary criticism. He is the recipient of numerous awards including the China Times Literature Award and the 10th United Daily News Literature Prize. In 2007, he was a visiting writer at the Iowa Writers' Workshop.

Themes and Style 
The only child of mainland Chinese immigrants who fled the Kuomintang, Luo has attributed the themes of alienation and migration in novels such as Tangut Inn, which combines science fiction with characteristics of postmodern literature, or the quasi-autobiographical vignettes that comprise We, to his own experience of cultural outsiderness growing up in Taiwan. His style has been described by David Der-wei Wang as "pseudo-autobiographical intimate narratives constituting a relay race of fragments, filled with uncanny and decadent imagery and undergirded by an immoral worldview".

Legacy and Impact 
Luo's essay collection My Little Boys (小兒子) has been adapted into a play by Huang Zhi-kai of the theater troupe Story Works (故事工廠).

Luo's Tangut Inn has been adapted into a play by Wei Ing-chuan (魏瑛娟).

Xu Rong-zhe (許榮哲), Taiwanese author of the novel 迷藏 (Mi-Cang), once said that he was influenced by Luo Yijun and Taiwanese author Yuan Zhe-sheng (袁哲生).

Awards and honors

Bibliography

Short story collections 
●	The Red Ink Gang / Red Character Group (Taipei: Unitas Publishing. 1993. )

●	We Left the Bar of the Night (Crown culture Publishing. 1993. )

●	Wife Dreams of Dog (Yuan-Liou Publishing. 1998. )

●	We / Us (Taipei: INK Publishing. 2004. )

●	Nativity of the Zodiacs / Born Into the Twelfth Sign (Taipei: INK Publishing. 2005. )

●	Letter / Alphabets A-F (Participation: Chen Xue, Tong Wei Ge, Yan Zhong Xian, Hu Shu Wen, Yang Kai Lin) (Acropolis Publishing. 2017. )

Novels 
●	The Third Dancer (Taipei: Unitas Publishing. 1999. )

●	Moon Family / Family of the Moon (Taipei: Unitas Publishing. 2000. )

●	Elegy (Taipei: Rye Field Publishing. 2001. )

●	The Distance / Far Away (Taipei: INK Publishing. 2003. )

●	My Future 2nd Son’s Memory of Me (Taipei: INK Publishing. 2005. )

●	Tangut Inn (Taipei: INK Publishing. 2008. )

●	Daughter (Taipei: INK Publishing. 2014. )

●	Kuang chao ren (匡超人) (Rye Field Publishing. 2017. )

Prose 
●	Wo ai luo (我愛羅) (Taipei: INK Publishing. 2006. )

●	In Search of Lost Time (Taipei: INK Publishing. 2006. )

●	Jingji da xiaotiao shiqi de mengyou jie (經驗大蕭條時期的夢遊街) (Taipei: INK Publishing. 2009. )

●	Face Book (Taipei: INK Publishing. 2012. )

●	My Little Boys (Taipei: INK Publishing. 2014. )

●	May Our Joy Stay: My Little Boys 2 (Taipei: INK Publishing. 2015. )

●	Fitness v.s. Fatness (with Dung Kai Cheung) (Taipei: INK Publishing. 2016. )

●	Hu ren shuo shu (胡人說書) (Taipei: INK Publishing. 2017. )

●	Chun zhen de dan you (純真的擔憂) (Taipei: INK Publishing. 2018. )

●	Taxi Driver (Taipei: INK Publishing. 2018. )

Fairy tales 
●	Children's Tales for the Little Star (Crown Culture Publishing. 1994. )

Poems 
●	Luo Yi Jun’s Poetry: The Story of Abandonment (Self-published. 1995.)

●	The Story of Abandonment (Taipei: INK Publishing. 2013.

Plays 
●	Qing xie (傾斜) (graduation production of The Graduate Institute of Theatre Arts and Playwriting in Taipei National University of Arts, 1995)

Picture books 
●	Kafei guan li de jiaohuan gushi (咖啡館裡的交換故事) (with Li Ya, Xi Niu, Wang Yan Kai, Lin Yi jie, Xiao Ya quan, Chen Yong kai, Sun Yi Ping, Huo chai, Lan Han Jie, Tin Tin & A Qiao, Guo Yu Yi, Zeng Yu Jie, etc.) (Locus Publishing. 2010. )

●	My Little Boys: Ye wan bao shi bao long (夜晚暴食暴龍) (Taipei: INK Publishing. 2018. )

●	My Little Boys: Ming da de zhang lang (命大的蟑螂) (Taipei: INK Publishing. 2018. )

●	My Little Boys: You yong (游泳) (Taipei: INK Publishing. 2018. )

●	My Little Boys: Lan san (爛傘) (Taipei: INK Publishing. 2018. )

●	My Little Boys: Chao jia (吵架) (Taipei: INK Publishing. 2018. )

Editor in Chief 
●	Collected Short Stories 2009 (Editor in chief: Luo Yi Jun. Chiu Ko Publishing. 2010. )

●	Pi mei mao de fa qing ──LP xiao shuo xuan (媲美貓的發情-LP小說選) (Editor in Chief: Luo Yi Jun and Huang Jin Shu. Aquarius Culture Publishing. 2007. )

References

1967 births
21st-century Taiwanese poets
Taiwanese essayists
Taiwanese literary critics
Postmodern writers
Chinese Culture University alumni
Taipei National University of the Arts alumni
Living people
Taiwanese male novelists
International Writing Program alumni
Writers from Taipei